The .33 Winchester Center Fire (colloquially .33 WCF or .33 Win) is an American centerfire rifle cartridge.

History
With the brand new Model 1886 lever-action rifle and appearance of the smokeless powder on the market, in 1891 Winchester Repeating Arms Company started to experiment with necking down .45-70, but the first attempt, .31-62 with a 200-grain bullet, reportedly resulted in pressures too high for the action; only a decade later the desired result was achieved with a new caliber, new steels and matured powders, when a new medium-bore cartridge was introduced. Never popular due to lack of range despite high muzzle velocity (M1886's tube magazine ensured that an aerodynamic pointed-tip bullet couldn't be used except while single loading), it survived until the Model 86 was dropped in 1936. It was also offered in the Marlin Model 1895 and Winchester's own single-shot Model 1885.

Use
A good round for deer, elk, or black bear in wooded terrain at medium range, it out performs the ballistically similar .35 Remington and can be improved with modern powders. The .33 WCF was replaced by the more powerful .348 Winchester and stopped being commercially offered in 1940.

Dimensions

See also
8mm caliber
List of cartridges by caliber
List of rifle cartridges
List of Winchester Center Fire cartridges

References

Bibliography
 Barnes, Frank C., ed. by John T. Amber. ".33 Winchester", in Cartridges of the World, pp. 83, 122, & 123. Northfield, IL: DBI Books, 1972. .

Pistol and rifle cartridges
Winchester Repeating Arms Company cartridges